Strathmore is an 1849 historical tragedy by the British writer John Westland Marston. It premiered at the Theatre Royal, Haymarket in London on 20 June 1849. The original cast included Charles Kean as Halbert Strathmore,  Henry Hughes as Sir Rupert Lorn, Henry Howe as Bycefield, John Baldwin Buckstone as Roland, Ellen Kean as Katharine Lorn and Fanny Fitzwilliam as Janet. It is set during The Killing Time amidst repression of the Scottish Covenanter religious movement in the seventeenth century.

References

Bibliography
 Nicoll, Allardyce. A History of Early Nineteenth Century Drama 1800-1850. Cambridge University Press, 1930.
 Rowell, George. Victorian Dramatic Criticism. Routledge, 2015. 

1849 plays
West End plays
British plays
Historical plays
Tragedy plays
Plays set in Scotland
Plays set in the 17th century
Plays by John Westland Marston